Callosiope banghaasi is a moth in the family Cossidae, and the only species in the genus Callosiope. It is found on Peninsular Malaysia and Sumatra.

References

Natural History Museum Lepidoptera generic names catalog

Ratardinae